Gərməxana is a former village in what is now the Ismailli Rayon of Azerbaijan. It suffered from a devastating fire in 1902.

References 

Populated places in Ismayilli District